Rure Ke Kalan or Rureke Kalan, is a small village with a population of about 5000 people located in Punjab, India. Khurd and Kalan Persian language word which means small and Big respectively when two villages have same name then it is distinguished as Kalan means Big and Khurd means Small with Village Name.The village is situated on the Barnala-to-Mansa Road, approximately 17 km from Barnala. It lies within the Tapa subdivision of Barnala district in Punjab. Rure-Ke-Kalan has a st Xavier school, with kerala staff, one high school, two private model schools, one primary health dispensary, one veterinary dispensary, a post office and numerous business shops.

Villages in Barnala district